Zörbig is a town in the district of Anhalt-Bitterfeld in Saxony-Anhalt, Germany. It is situated approximately 15 km west of Bitterfeld, and 20 km northeast of Halle (Saale). Zörbig is well known for its molasses made from sugar beets.

Geography 
The town Zörbig consists of the following Ortschaften or municipal divisions:

Cösitz
Göttnitz
Großzöberitz
Löberitz
Quetzdölsdorf
Salzfurtkapelle
Schortewitz
Schrenz
Spören
Stumsdorf
Zörbig

People 
 Thomas Selle (1599–1663), composer and church musician
 Johann Jacob Reiske (1716–1774), Graezist, Arabist and Byzantinist
 August Gottlieb Richter (1742–1812), surgeon
 Carl Marx (1911–1991), painter, pupil at the Bauhaus Dessau 1931-33

References